Kelly Plitz (born 31 October 1957) is a Canadian equestrian. She competed in two events at the 1984 Summer Olympics.

Her husband Ian Roberts is also an Olympic equestrian, while their son Waylon is a two-time Pan American Games medalist in equestrian.

References

External links
 

1957 births
Living people
Canadian female equestrians
Olympic equestrians of Canada
Equestrians at the 1984 Summer Olympics
People from Ajax, Ontario
Sportspeople from Ontario